Minuscule 449 (in the Gregory-Aland numbering), ε 330 (in the Soden numbering), is a Greek minuscule manuscript of the New Testament, on parchment. Palaeographically it has been assigned to the 13th century.

Description 

The codex contains a complete text of the four Gospels in two volumes on 317 (146 + 171) parchment leaves. The text is written in one column per page, in 23-24 lines per page.

There is also a division according to the smaller Ammonian Sections (in Mark 233 Sections - the last in 16:8), with references to the Eusebian Canons.

It was clearly carefully written.

Text 

The Greek text of the codex is a representative of the Byzantine text-type. Aland placed it in Category V. According to the Claremont Profile Method it belongs to the textual cluster 291 and creates textual pair with minuscule 2603 in Luke 1, Luke 10, and Luke 20.

History 

The manuscripts was written by Gerasimus, a monk. It once belonged together with the codex 44 to Caesar de Missy (1703–1775), French chaplain. It came to London in 1748. It was the last manuscript added to the list of New Testament manuscripts by Scholz (1794–1852).

It was purchased for the British Museum in 1776. Scholz examined it only in Mark 5. C. R. Gregory saw it in 1883.

It is currently housed at the British Library (Add MS 4950-4951) in London.

See also 

 List of New Testament minuscules
 Biblical manuscript
 Textual criticism

References

Further reading

External links 
 Add MS 4950 at the British Library

Greek New Testament minuscules
13th-century biblical manuscripts
British Library additional manuscripts